San Marino made its Paralympic Games début at the 2012 Summer Paralympics in London, sending a single, wildcard wheelchair athlete (Christian Bernardi) to compete in the shot put. He did not win a medal.

Full results for San Marino at the Paralympics

See also
 San Marino at the Olympics

References